Katechaki, also known as Katehaki on signage, is an Athens Metro Line 3 (Blue Line) station, located at Katechaki Avenue and Mesogeion Avenue.
Nearby locations include:
 The former Ministry of Public Order
 401 Military Hospital of Athens
 Goudi Olympic Complex
 National Glyptotheque of Greece
 National Technical University of Athens Zografou campus.

Station layout

Cultural works
Vasso Peklari's Sculptural forms (Greek: Φόρμες με Υφαντό Χαλκό) is at the station's concourse.

Citations

Athens Metro stations
Railway stations opened in 2000
2000 establishments in Greece